Uppvidinge Municipality (Uppvidinge kommun) is a municipality in Kronoberg County, southern Sweden, with its seat in the town of Åseda.

The present municipality, which took its name from a hundred, was formed by the local government reform of 1971 when Lenhovda, Nottebäck, Åseda and Älghult were amalgamated. The number of original entities, as of 1863, is six. The first amalgamation in the area (Granhult merged with Nottebäck) took place already in 1915.

The municipality has a rather small population but its slogan states "In a Small Municipality Man Becomes Large".

More than 80% of the area is covered with forests, making it live up to the general public's impression of the "dark" province of Småland. The name Uppvidinge itself means something like forest on a hill. The coat of arms is based on the insignia of Uppvidinge Hundred, from a document from 1568. It depicts a herb of unknown species in a red color.

Localities
There are 5 urban areas (also called a Tätort or locality) in Uppvidinge Municipality.

In the table the localities are listed according to the size of the population as of December 31, 2005. The municipal seat is in bold characters.

References

Notes
Statistics Sweden

External links

Uppvidinge Municipality - Official site
Coat of arms

Municipalities of Kronoberg County